The Baroness Redecorates is the second EP by Canadian singer-songwriter and pianist Sarah Slean, released on December 9, 2008. Slean confirmed the EP and two of its tracks on her official website in her journal during Question and Answer periods. The rest of the track listing was confirmed on her website in November.

Track listing 
 Parasol
 Lonely Side of the Moon
 Modern Man I & II
 Compatriots
 The Rose
 Hear Me Out
 The "Disarm" Suite

References

External links 
 Sarah Slean's official website

2008 EPs
Sarah Slean albums